Megomphicidae is a taxonomic family of air-breathing land snails, terrestrial pulmonate gastropod mollusks in the superfamily Acavoidea (according to the taxonomy of the Gastropoda by Bouchet & Rocroi, 2005).

Genera
The family Megomphicidae has no subfamilies.

Genera within the family Megomphicidae include: 
 Ammonitella  J. G. Cooper, 1868
 Glyptostoma Bland and W. G. Binney, 1873
 Megomphix  H. B. Baker, 1930
 Polygyrella  W. G. Binney, 1863
 Polygyroidea  Pilsbry, 1930

References

 ITIS info